Rickettsia rickettsii (abbreviated as R. rickettsii)  is a gram-negative, intracellular, coccobacillus bacterium that is around 0.8 to 2.0 μm long. R. rickettsii is the causative agent of Rocky Mountain spotted fever. R. rickettsii is one of the most pathogenic Rickettsia strains. It affects a large majority of the Western Hemisphere and small portions of the Eastern Hemisphere.

History
Rocky Mountain spotted fever (RMSF) first emerged in the Idaho Valley in 1896. At that time, not much information was known about the disease; it was originally called Black Measles because patients had a characteristic spotted rash appearance throughout their body. The first clinical description of Rocky Mountain Spotted Fever was reported in 1899 by Edward E. Maxey.

Howard Ricketts (1871–1910), an associate professor of pathology at the University of Chicago in 1902, was the first to identify and study R. rickettsii.  At this time, the trademark rash now began to slowly emerge in the western Montana area, with an 80-90% mortality rate. His research entailed interviewing victims of the disease and collecting and studying infected animals. He was also known to inject himself with pathogens to measure their effects. Unfortunately, his research was cut short by his death, likely from an insect bite.

Simeon Burt Wolbach is credited for the first detailed description of the pathogenic agent that causes R. rickettsii in 1919. He clearly recognized it as an intracellular bacterium which was seen most frequently in endothelial cells.

Pathogen life cycle
The most common hosts for the R. rickettsii bacteria are ticks. Ticks that carry R. rickettsia fall into the family of Ixodidae ticks, also known as "hard bodied" ticks. Ticks are vectors, reservoirs and amplifiers of this disease.

There are currently three known tick specifics that commonly carry R. rickettsii.
 American dog tick (Dermacentor variabilis) 
 Rocky Mountain Wood Tick (Dermacentor andersoni)
 Brown dog tick (Rhipicephalus sanguine). 
Ticks can contract R. rickettsii by many means. First, an uninfected tick can become infected when feeding on the blood of an infected vertebrate host; such as a rabbit, during the larval or nymph stages, this mode of transmission called transstadial transmission. Once a tick becomes infected with this pathogen, they are infected for life. Both the American dog tick and the Rocky Mountain wood tick serve as long-term reservoirs for Rickettsia rickettsii, in which the organism resides in the tick posterior diverticulae of the midgut, the small intestine and the ovaries. In addition, an infected male tick can transmit the organism to an uninfected female during mating. Once infected, the female tick can transmit the infection to her offspring, in a process known as transovarian passage.

Transmission in mammals
Due to its confinement in the midgut and small intestine, Rickettsia rickettsii can be transmitted to mammals, including humans. Transmission to mammals can occur in multiple ways. One way of contraction is through the contact of infected host feces to an uninfected host. If infected host feces comes into contact with an open skin wound, it is possible for the disease to be transmitted. Additionally, an uninfected host can become infected with R. rickettsii when eating food that contains the feces of the infected vector.

Another way of contraction is by the bite of an infected tick. After getting bitten by an infected tick, R. rickettsiae is transmitted to the bloodstream by tick salivary secretions.

R. rickettsii has also been found to distort the sex ratio of their hosts. This is done by eradicating males and undergoing pathogenesis, this is done primarily via horizontal gene transfer. By eradicating male hosts, female host can pass the R. rickettsii gene to her offspring giving R. rickettsii bacteria yet another way to infect hosts. 

By having multiple modes of transmission this ensures the persistence of R. rickettsii in a population. Also, by having multiple modes of transmission this helps the disease adapt better to new environments and prevents it from becoming eradicated. R. rickettsii has evolved a number of strategical mechanisms or virulence factors that allow them to invade the host immune system and successfully infect the host.

Genomic Structure 
R. rickettsii is an obligate intracellular alpha proteobacteria that belongs to the Rickettsiacea family. It is a pleomorphic, gram-negative coccobacillus that multiplies by binary fission. R. rickettsii is shown to have a genome size of around 2,100 kb. This number was determined via pulsed-field gel electrophoresis.

Virulence
Since R. rickettsii needs a moving vector to contract the disease to a viable host it is more likely that this pathogen has moderately low virulence levels. This idea is supported by the tradeoff hypothesis which suggests that virulence of a pathogen will evolve until the level of virulence balances out with the level of transmission to maximize the spread of the pathogen. R. rickettsii invades the endothelial cells that line the blood vessels in the hosts body. Endothelial cells are not phagocytic in nature; however, after attachment to the cell surface, the pathogen causes changes in the host cell cytoskeleton that induces phagocytosis. Since the bacteria can now induce phagocytosis the R. rickettsii gene can be replicated and further invade other cells in the host's body.

Around the world 
R. rickettsii is found on every continent excluding Antarctica. The disease was first discovered in North America and since then has been identified in almost every corner of the earth. The spread of R. rickettsii is likely due to the migration of humans and animals around the globe. However, R. rickettsii tends to thrive in warm damp places and this can be seen by contraction rates around the world. Environments are constantly changing so the fluctuation of the disease is never constant in a population and this correlates to the evolution of R. rickettsii.

Clinical manifestations
The Centers for Disease Control and Prevention states that the diagnosis of Rocky Mountain Spotted Fever must be made based on the clinical signs and symptoms of the patient and then later confirmed using specialized laboratory tests. However, the diagnosis of Rocky Mountain Spotted Fever is often misdiagnosed due to its non-specific onset.  If not treated properly the illness may become serious, leading to hospitalization and possible fatality.

Initial signs and symptoms
During the initial stages of the disease, the patient could experience:
 fever
 nausea
 vomiting
 loss of appetite
 conjunctival injection (red eyes)

Rash
The classic Rocky Mountain Spotted Fever rash occurs in about 90% of patients and develops 2 to 5 days after the onset of fever. The characteristic rash appear as small, flat, pink macules that develop peripherally on the patient's body, such as the wrists, forearms, ankles, and feet. During the course of the disease, the rash will take on a more darkened red to purple spotted appearance and become more evenly distributed.

Late signs and symptoms
Diarrhea, abdominal and joint pain, and pinpoint reddish lesions (petechiae) are observed during the late stages of the disease.

Severe infections
Patients with severe infections may require hospitalization. They may become thrombocytopenic, hyponatremic, experience elevated liver enzymes, and other more pronounced symptoms.  It is not uncommon for severe cases to involve the respiratory system, central nervous system, gastrointestinal system or the renal system complications. This disease is worst for elderly patients, males, African-Americans, alcoholics, and patients with G6PD deficiency.  Deaths usually are caused by heart and kidney failure.

Diagnosis and treatment

Laboratory confirmation
Rocky Mountain Spotted Fever is often diagnosed using an indirect immunofluorescence assay (IFA), which is considered the reference standard by the Centers for Disease Control and Prevention (CDC). The IFA will detect an increase in IgG or IgM antibodies in the bloodstream.

A more specific lab test used in diagnosing Rocky Mountain Spotted Fever is polymerase chain reaction or PCR which can detect the presence of rickettiae DNA.

Immunohistochemical (IHC) staining is another diagnostic approach where a skin biopsy is taken of the spotted rash; however, accuracy is only 70%.

Antibiotics
Doxycycline and Chloramphenicol are the most common drugs of choice for reducing the symptoms associated with RMSF. When it is suspected that a patient may have RMSF, it is crucial that antibiotic therapy be administered promptly. Failure to receive antibiotic therapy, especially during the initial stages of the disease, may lead to end-organ failure (heart, kidney, lungs) meningitis, brain damage, shock, and even death.

Preventative Measures

The main preventive measures are taken by containing and eliminating the carrier of the pathogen. Wearing long sleeve shirts and pants when in grassy areas provides a barrier from possible tick bites. By clearing leaf piles from the yard this will lessen the likelihood of ticks being in close proximity. Also by placing piles of wood in the sun  eliminate the chance for ticks to reside in them.  According to the CDC, using insect repellent and checking pets for ticks after being out in wooded or grassy areas can decrease the chances of being bitten by a tick carrying the pathogen significantly.

References

External links
 
 
 
 

Rickettsiaceae
Zoonoses
Gram-negative bacteria
Bacteria described in 1922